Sinbad: Legend of the Seven Seas (also known as Sinbad) is a 2003 American animated adventure film produced by DreamWorks Animation and distributed by DreamWorks Pictures. Like the studio's previous film, Spirit: Stallion of the Cimarron (2002), the film combines traditional animation with some computer animation. Featuring the character Sinbad the Sailor, it was directed by Tim Johnson and Patrick Gilmore (in his feature directorial debut) and written by John Logan, and stars the voices of Brad Pitt, Catherine Zeta-Jones, Michelle Pfeiffer, and Joseph Fiennes. It covers the story of Sinbad (voiced by Pitt), a pirate who travels the sea with his dog and his loyal crew, alongside Marina (voiced by Zeta-Jones), the fiancée of his childhood friend Prince Proteus (voiced by Fiennes), to recover the stolen Book of Peace from Eris (voiced by Pfeiffer) to save Proteus from approving Sinbad's death sentence. The film blends elements from One Thousand and One Nights and classical mythology.

Sinbad was released on July 2nd, 2003, and received mixed reviews from critics, who praised the animation, action sequences, and voice performances, but criticized the storyline and polarizing CGI. Grossing $80.8 million on a $60 million budget, Sinbad was a box-office bomb, causing DreamWorks to suffer a $125 million loss on a string of films, which nearly bankrupted them. To date, this soon became the final DreamWorks Animation film to use traditional animation, as this studio abandoned that in favor of computer animation. However, DreamWorks brought 2D animation back for the 5-minute short film Bird Karma in 2018.

Plot 
Sinbad and his pirate crew attempt to steal the magical "Book of Peace" and hold it for ransom as one last job before retiring to Fiji. Sinbad is surprised to see it is being protected while on board to Syracuse, Sicily by Prince Proteus of Syracuse. Proteus was Sinbad's best friend as a child, and he tells him that if their friendship ever meant anything to Sinbad, he can prove it now. Sinbad tries to steal the book anyway, but is prevented when Cetus attacks the ship. The two work together to fight off Cetus and for a moment reaffirm their bond. Just when it seems the beast is defeated, Sinbad is dragged off the ship. Proteus goes to save Sinbad, but he is stopped by his crew.

Drawn underwater by Cetus, Sinbad is saved by the beautiful Goddess of Discord, Eris, who offers him any boon he desires in exchange for the Book of Peace. Sinbad and his crew go to Syracuse to steal the Book, but after seeing Proteus with his fiancé Lady Marina, Sinbad abandons the mission without giving a motive. Anticipating this, Eris impersonates Sinbad and steals the Book herself. Sinbad is sentenced to death, whereupon Proteus sends Sinbad to retrieve the Book instead, placing himself as a hostage, and Marina goes to make sure that Sinbad succeeds. To prevent them from succeeding, Eris sends a group of mythical sirens, who entrance and seduce the men aboard Sinbad's ship with their hypnotic singing voices, but do not affect Marina, who pilots the ship to safety and wins the favor of the crew. However, as she and Sinbad continue to argue with each other, Eris soon realizes these disharmonies and sends in a roc. The Roc captures Marina, but she is rescued by Sinbad, and they successfully defeat the creature, causing a reconciliation between the two.

After these and other incidents, Sinbad and Marina talk in a brief moment of peace - Marina reveals that she's always dreamed of a life on the sea, and Sinbad reveals that he distanced himself from Proteus 10 years earlier because he loved Marina. They suddenly then reach and enter Eris' realm where she reveals that her plan was to maneuver Proteus into Sinbad's place, leaving Syracuse without an heir to collapse into chaos. Through Marina, Eris agrees to surrender the Book of Peace only if Sinbad truthfully tells whether he will return to Syracuse to accept blame and be executed if he does not get the Book. She gives him her word that she will honor the deal, making it unbreakable even for a god. When he answers that he will return, Eris calls him a liar, and returns him and Marina to the mortal world. Ashamed, Sinbad admits the Goddess of Discord is right, truly believing deep down that he is a selfish, black-hearted liar. Only, for Marina to tell him she is wrong, giving Sinbad a change of heart.

In Syracuse, the time allotted to Sinbad has elapsed. Proteus readies himself to be beheaded, but at the last minute, Sinbad appears and takes his place. An enraged Eris appears suddenly and saves Sinbad by shattering the executioner's sword to pieces. Sinbad, shocked, realizes that this was still part of her test and that he has beaten her by proving his answer to be true after all. Eris is furious but cannot go back on her word as a goddess, and begrudgingly gives the book to Sinbad. With the true culprit revealed, Sinbad is pardoned for the crime of stealing the book and is now well-respected.

With the Book restored to Syracuse, Proteus and Sinbad leave still as the best of friends. Sinbad and his crew prepare to leave on another voyage, leaving Marina in Syracuse. Unbeknownst to him, Proteus sees that Marina has fallen deeply in love with Sinbad and life on the sea, and releases her from their engagement, sending her to join Sinbad's ship. Marina surprises Sinbad by revealing her presence on the ship just as it begins to sail, and the two share a kiss. Now together, they and the crew set out on another long voyage as the ship sails into the sunset.

Voice cast 
Brad Pitt as Sinbad, an adventurous pirate and sailor who plans on retiring to Fiji.
Catherine Zeta-Jones as Lady Marina, a Thracian ambassador to Syracuse, Proteus’s fiancé, and Sinbad’s love interest. 
Michelle Pfeiffer as Eris, the beautiful and manipulative Goddess of Discord and Chaos who wants to create destruction throughout the world.
Joseph Fiennes as Prince Proteus of Syracuse, Sinbad's noble childhood-friend and Marina's fiancé.
Dennis Haysbert as Kale, Sinbad's first mate.
Adriano Giannini as "Rat", an Italian lookout of Sinbad's crew.
Timothy West as King Dymas of Syracuse, Proteus’ father.
Jim Cummings as Luca, an elderly member of Sinbad's crew and The Ambassador leader.
Conrad Vernon as Jed, a comically heavily armed member of Sinbad's crew.
 Raman Hui as Jin, an Asian member of Sinbad's crew who frequently makes bets with Li.
Chung Chan as Li, an Asian member of Sinbad's crew who frequently makes bets with Jin.
Andrew Birch as Grum and Chum, members of Sinbad's crew.
 Frank Welker (uncredited) as Spike, Sinbad's pet mastiff who Marina grows a soft spot for.
 Chris Miller as Tower Guard.

Production

Development 
Shortly after co-writing Aladdin (1992) for Disney, screenwriters Ted Elliott and Terry Rossio came up with the idea of adapting the story of Sinbad the Sailor in the vein of the story of Damon and Pythias before settling on a love triangle. They wrote a treatment inspired by screwball romantic comedy films with Sinbad as a reserved apprentice cartographer who joins Peri, a free-spirited female smuggler, on an adventure and falls in love. The story was based largely on the 'Simbad' comic book written and illustrated by Elena Poirier (1949-1956). In July 1992, Disney had announced they were adapting the story into a potential animated feature. The project was cancelled in 1993.

In 1994, after Jeffrey Katzenberg founded DreamWorks and started Prince of Egypts works, he decided to re-start some ideas that Disney cancelled, like The Road to El Dorado or Sinbad; he involved Antzs director Tim Johnson in the making of an animated feature about Sinbad the Sailor.
Shortly after writing Gladiator (2000), John Logan was approached by Katzenberg to write the script for an animated film. When he was offered the story of Sinbad, Logan researched the multiple tales of the character before settling on depicting the Greek and Roman versions. He described his first draft script as "very complex, the relationships were very adult. It was too intense in terms of the drama for the audience that this movie was aimed at."

Casting 
Russell Crowe was originally set to voice Sinbad, but he dropped out due to scheduling conflicts. He was replaced by Brad Pitt, who wanted to make a film that his nieces and nephews could see. He explained, "They can't get into my movies. People's heads getting cut off, and all that." Pitt had already tried to narrate DreamWorks' previous animated film Spirit: Stallion of the Cimarron, but "it didn't work", with Matt Damon taking over the role. Pitt's purist intentions worried him that his Missourian accent would not be suitable for the Middle Eastern character, but was persuaded by the filmmakers that his accent would lighten the mood.

Michelle Pfeiffer, who voices Eris, the Goddess of Discord, had struggles with pinning down the character's personality, initially finding her "too sexual," and then too dull. After the third rewrite, Pfeiffer called Jeffrey Katzenberg and told him, "You know, you really can fire me," but he assured her that this was just part of the process.

Animation 
In January 2001, it was reported that DreamWorks Animation would completely transfer their animation workflow into using the Linux operating system. Previously, their animation and rendering software had used Silicon Graphics Image servers and workstations, but as their hardware began to show slowness, DreamWorks began looking for an alternate platform for superior optimal performance in order to save hardware costs. In 2002, they decided to partner with Hewlett-Packard for a three-year deal for which they used their dual-processor HP workstations and ProLiant servers running Red Hat Linux software. Starting with Spirit: Stallion of the Cimarron (2002), they had replaced its entire render farm with x86-based Linux servers.

Sinbad: Legend of the Seven Seas was the first DreamWorks Animation production to completely utilize Linux software, with more than 250 workstations used. Starting with storyboards, the artists first drew sketches on paper to visualize the scene, which were later edited into animatics. For the character animation, rough character sketches were passed through the ToonShooter software, which digitized the sketches. From that point, the animators were able to easily integrate the animation into existing scenes. Production software lead Derek Chan explained, "ToonShooter is an internal tool we wrote for Linux. It captures low resolution 640 x 480 line art that the artists use to time the film." The animated characters were then digitally colored using the Linux software application, InkAndPaint.

For the visual effects, DreamWorks Animation had used Autodesk Maya to create water effects. However, the rendering was found to be too photorealistic, and senior software engineer for advanced R&D future films Galen Gornowicz sought to modify the effects so as to closely match the movie's visual development renderings. Craig Ring, who served as digital supervisor on the film, described four major approaches to water used in the film: compositing ripple distortion over the painted backgrounds; creating fluid simulation; developing a rapid slashing technique to create a surface and then send ripples through the surface; and better integrating the 3D visual effects with stylized, hand drawn splashes.

The film's traditional animation and its final line services were provided by Stardust Pictures and Bardel Entertainment, with PDI/DreamWorks handling its computer animation technology and CG character animation.

Release

Marketing 
A PC game based on the film was released by Atari, who worked closely with one of the film's directors, Patrick Gilmore. It was released before the VHS and DVD release of the film. Burger King released six promotional toys at the time of the film's release, and each toy came with a "Constellation Card". Hasbro produced a series of Sinbad figures as part of its G.I. JOE action figure brand. The figures were 12" tall and came with a mythical monster.

Home media 
Sinbad: Legend of the Seven Seas was released on DVD and VHS on November 18, 2003, by DreamWorks Home Entertainment. The DVD included a six-minute interactive short animated film Cyclops Island, featuring an encounter with the eponymous Cyclopes. In July 2014, the film's distribution rights were purchased by DreamWorks Animation from Paramount Pictures (owners of the pre-2011 DreamWorks Pictures library) and transferred to 20th Century Fox before reverting to Universal Studios in 2018; Universal Pictures Home Entertainment subsequently released the film on Blu-ray Disc on June 4, 2019, with the Cyclops Island short removed.

Cyclops Island 
Cyclops Island (also known as Sinbad and the Cyclops Island) is a traditionally animated interactive short film that acts as a sequel to Sinbad: Legend of the Seven Seas, taking place shortly after the events of the previous film.

Instead of travelling to Fiji, Sinbad and his crew decide to spend their vacation on the tropical island of Krakatoa. While attempting to find a source of fresh water on the island, Marina and Spike run into a tribe of Cyclopes who they have to defeat with the help of Sinbad, Kale, and Rat. When Sinbad dislodges a large boulder during the fight, a volcano erupts and the island goes down in flames. Marina then suggests looking for a nicer destination for their next holiday, such as Pompeii.

While watching the short film on DVD, the viewer can choose to follow different characters to see different angles of the same story. The viewer can follow Sinbad, the duo of Kale and Rat, Marina, or Spike. Brad Pitt, Catherine Zeta-Jones, Dennis Haysbert, and Adriano Giannini all reprised their roles from the original film. On the film's VHS release, the short film takes place after the movie ends but before the credits roll, and is shown in its entirety.

Reception

Critical response 
On the review aggregator website Rotten Tomatoes, Sinbad: Legend of the Seven Seas has an approval rating of 45% based on 128 reviews with an average rating of 5.63/10. The site's consensus reads: "Competent, but not magical." Metacritic, which assigns a normalized rating, has a score of 48 based on 33 reviews, indicating "mixed or average reviews". Audiences polled by CinemaScore gave the film an average grade of "A-" on an A+ to F scale.

Kirk Honeycutt of The Hollywood Reporter praised the film, writing that "Sinbad is a cartoon that does what matinée [afternoon showings] moviemakers of old never had the resources to do: allow their imagination to run amok in an ancient world that never existed―but should have." He praised the animation and backgrounds as "lushly rendered by the animation artists, displaying details not only from the world according to Ray Harryhausen; but from the Greco-Roman world and Middle East. As with all good animation, these serve as backdrops to the comedy and adventure the characters encounter every second." Roger Ebert of the Chicago Sun-Times gave the film three-and-a-half stars, concluding that "Sinbad: Legend of the Seven Seas is another worthy entry in the recent renaissance of animation, and in the summer that has already given us Finding Nemo, it's a reminder that animation is the most liberating of movie genres, freed of gravity, plausibility, and even the matters of lighting and focus. There is no way that Syracuse could exist outside animation, and as we watch it, we are sailing over the edge of the human imagination."

Claudia Puig, reviewing for USA Today, summarized that "Sinbad is a swashbuckling adventure saga that probably will appeal more to older kids. But it's not a wondrous tale. The effects are competent, the action has exciting moments, and the story is interesting enough, but the parts don't add up to a compelling sum." Todd McCarthy of Variety wrote, "A passably entertaining animated entry from DreamWorks that's closer to The Road to El Dorado than to Shrek, Sinbad: Legend of the Seven Seas tries too strenuously to contemporize ancient settings and characters for the sake of connecting with modern kids." Elvis Mitchell of The New York Times panned the film, suggesting the film featured a "boatload of celebrities slumming through another not-quite-thawed adventure story." Additionally, he claimed "more thought and care were lavished on the design of the monsters than on the hand-drawn lead characters, who have the same kind of sketchy features as the stars of those animated Bible story cartoons sold on late-night infomercials."

There was additional criticism for the film's departure from its Arabic origin. Jack Shaheen, a critic of Hollywood's portrayal of Arabs, believed that "the studio feared financial and possibly political hardships if they made the film's hero Arab," and claimed that "if no attempt is made to challenge negative stereotypes about Arabs, the misperceptions continue. It's regrettable that the opportunity wasn't taken to change them, especially in the minds of young people." At one point, Shaheen asked Katzenberg to include some references to Arabic culture in the film. According to Shaheen, "he didn't seem surprised that I mentioned it, which presumably means that it was discussed early on in the development of the film."

Box office 
On the film's opening weekend, the film earned $6.9 million and $10 million since its Wednesday start. It reached sixth place at the box office and faced early competition from Terminator 3: Rise of the Machines, Legally Blonde 2: Red, White & Blonde, Charlie's Angels: Full Throttle, Finding Nemo, and Hulk. The week after its release, the similarly themed film Pirates of the Caribbean: The Curse of the Black Pearl premiered, in which Sinbad grossed $4.3 million finishing seventh. The film closed on October 9, 2003, after earning $26.5 million in the United States and Canada and $54.3 million overseas, for a worldwide total of $80.7 million.

The box office run of Sinbad flopped causing a loss of $125 million for DreamWorks Animation. When speaking of the disappointment, Katzenberg commented, "I think the idea of a traditional story being told using traditional animation is likely a thing of the past."

Soundtrack 
The score is composed by Harry Gregson-Williams, on his fourth collaboration with DreamWorks Animation, and his first DreamWorks film that he scored solely by himself, since he also collaborated with John Powell on the previous films such as Antz (1998), Chicken Run (2000), and Shrek (2001). It is also the only DreamWorks Hand-Drawn film to not have music composed by Hans Zimmer, who composed the previous films The Prince of Egypt (1998), The Road to El Dorado (2000; co-composed with John Powell), and Spirit: Stallion of the Cimarron (2002).

Video game 
A video game based on the film developed by Small Rockets and published by Atari was released on October 21, 2003, for Microsoft Windows.

References

External links 

 
 
 
 
 

2003 films
2003 animated films
2003 computer-animated films
2003 directorial debut films
2000s American animated films
2000s fantasy adventure films
2000s monster movies
American children's animated adventure films
American children's animated fantasy films
American fantasy adventure films
American fantasy comedy films
Animated adventure films
American animated comedy films
Animated films based on literature
2000s children's fantasy films
DreamWorks Animation animated films
DreamWorks Pictures films
Films scored by Harry Gregson-Williams
Films directed by Tim Johnson
Films produced by Jeffrey Katzenberg
Films set in Sicily
Pirate films
Films set in the Mediterranean Sea
Films with screenplays by John Logan
Films based on Sinbad the Sailor
Animated films based on classical mythology
2000s children's animated films
Roc (mythology)
2000s English-language films
Eris (mythology)
Sirens (mythology)